Allexander Hand (born 1836) was a quartermaster in the US Navy for the Union during the American Civil War who received the Medal of Honor. Prior to the Civil War, he resided in Delaware. His commanding officer later spoke for his "good conduct and cool bravery under enemy fire," which led to him receiving the Medal of Honor.

See also

Hamilton, North Carolina
Anaconda Plan
Blockade runner

Notes

References

External links
Naval History and Heritage Command: Ceres
Fort Branch Confederate: Earthen Fort Civil War Site

Union Navy sailors
United States Navy Medal of Honor recipients
American Civil War recipients of the Medal of Honor
1836 births
Year of death missing